Beyond the Ocean (French release titles: Les Oiseaux du ciel and Après l'océan) is a 2006 film directed by Éliane de Latour. Latour also did the screenplay. The film showed in the Panorama section of the 56th Berlin International Film Festival in February 2006. It also showed at the 2006 Edinburgh International Film Festival.

Plot 
Otho and Shad leave Abidjan to try their luck in Europe. They have a dream, to return to their country as heroes. However, exile is not a bed of roses. Once in Spain, Otho is arrested and deported to Côte d'Ivoire without attaining his goal. His former friends turn their backs on him. Shad manages to make his way to England where he meets Tango, a young rebellious Frenchwoman. The two lovers lean on each other for support, but the obstacles they must overcome are numerous.

Cast
Fraser James - Shad
Djedje Apali - Otho 
Marie-Josée Croze - Tango
Sara Martins - Olga
Lucien Jean-Baptiste - Tetanos
Tella Kpomahou - Pelagie
Malik Zidi - Bruno
Agnès Soral - The White
Kad Merad - Oncle de Tango 
Luce Mouchel - Tante de Tango 
Michel Bohiri - Père d'Otho 
Angeline Nadié - Mère d'Otho   
Gabriel Zahon - Père de Shad
Toupé Loué - Baudelaire

References

External links 
 (with French title Après l'océan)
 

2006 films
Ivorian drama films
French drama films
British drama films
2000s British films
2000s French films